Road Games is an EP (or, according to its vinyl sleeve, a "specially-priced 6-cut mini album") by guitarist Allan Holdsworth, released in 1983 through Warner Bros. Records originally on vinyl only; a CD edition was reissued through Gnarly Geezer Records in 2001.

Holdsworth is joined on the album by former Cream vocalist Jack Bruce (who sings “Was There?” and “Material Real”), his former Bruford bandmate, bassist Jeff Berlin, and then current Frank Zappa drummer Chad Wackerman. Former Juicy Lucy and Tempest frontman Paul Williams sings the title track.

Holdsworth claimed to have received no royalties from either release, naming it as one of his least favourite recordings due to numerous creative differences with executive producer Ted Templeman. Road Games nonetheless received a nomination for Best Rock Instrumental Performance at the 1984 Grammy Awards.

Critical reception

John W. Patterson at AllMusic awarded Road Games four stars out of five, describing it as "fusion-rock bliss" and Holdsworth's guitar work as "amazing". He also praised Chad Wackerman's "tastefully poised" drumming and Jeff Berlin's "killer" bass work.

Track listing

Personnel
Allan Holdsworth – guitar, production
Paul Williams – vocals (track 2)
Jack Bruce – vocals (tracks 5, 6)
Chad Wackerman – drums
Jeff Berlin – bass
Joe Turano – backing vocals
Paul Korda – backing vocals

Technical
Jeremy Smith – engineering
Jeff Silver – engineering
Gary Skardina – engineering
Robert Feist – engineering, mixing
Mark Linett – mixing
John Matousek – mastering
Joan Parker – production coordination
Ted Templeman – executive production
Tom Voli – executive production (reissue)
Eddie Jobson – executive production (reissue)

Awards

References

External links
Road Games at therealallanholdsworth.com (archived)
Allan Holdsworth "Road Games" at Guitar Nine

Allan Holdsworth albums
1983 EPs
Warner Records EPs
Albums produced by Ted Templeman
Grammy Award for Best Rock Instrumental Performance